Ryan Carr (born 23 September 2004) is an English professional footballer who plays as a midfielder for  club Carlisle United.

Career
Carr made his first-team debut at Carlisle United playing at right wing-back on 20 September 2022, in a 1–1 draw with Fleetwood Town in an EFL Trophy fixture at Brunton Park. Manager Paul Simpson said that: "I just think he’s got energy, and enthusiasm about him. I thought he did well".

Career statistics

References

2004 births
Living people
English footballers
Association football midfielders
Carlisle United F.C. players
English Football League players